Pristimantis glandulosus is a species of frog in the family Strabomantidae.
It is endemic to Ecuador.
Its natural habitats are tropical moist montane forests and high-altitude grassland.
It is threatened by habitat loss.

References

glandulosus
Endemic fauna of Ecuador
Amphibians of Ecuador
Amphibians of the Andes
Amphibians described in 1880
Taxonomy articles created by Polbot